Claudio Magris  (born 10 April 1939) is an Italian scholar, translator and writer. He was a senator for Friuli-Venezia Giulia from 1994 to 1996.

Life
Magris graduated from the University of Turin, where he studied German studies, and has been a professor of modern German literature at the University of Trieste since 1978.

He is an essayist and columnist for the Italian newspaper Corriere della Sera and for other European journals and newspapers. His numerous studies have helped to promote an awareness in Italy of Central European culture and of the literature of the Habsburg Myth, a concept which he coined in 1963.

Magris is a member of several European academies and served as senator in the Italian Senate from 1994 to 1996.

His first book on the Habsburg Myth in modern Austrian literature rediscovered central European literature. His journalistic writings have been collected in Dietro le parole ("Behind Words", 1978) and Itaca e oltre ("Ithaca and Beyond", 1982). He has written essays on E.T.A. Hoffmann, Henrik Ibsen, Italo Svevo, Robert Musil, Hermann Hesse and Jorge Luis Borges. His novels and theatre productions, many translated into several languages, include Illazioni su una sciabola (1984), Danubio (1986), Stadelmann (1988), Un altro mare (1991), and Microcosmi (1997).

His breakthrough was Danubio (1986), which is a magnum opus. In this book (said by the author to be a "drowned novel"), Magris tracks the course of the Danube from its sources to the sea. The whole trip evolves into a colorful, rich canvas of the multicultural European history.

Decorations and awards

 1980: Austrian Cross of Honour for Science and Art, 1st class
 1987: Bagutta Prize for Danubio
 1990: French Award for Best Foreign Book (essays) for Danubio
 1992: Humboldt Research Award from the Alexander von Humboldt Foundation
 1994: Gold Medal of Honour of the City of Vienna
 1997: Strega Prize for Microcosmi
 2000: Würth Prize for European Literature
 2001: Knight Grand Cross of the Order of Merit of the Italian Republic
 2001: Erasmus Prize
 2001: Leipzig Book Prize for European Understanding (Grand Prize)
 2001: Member of the Academy of Arts Berlin
 2004: Prince of Asturias Award for Literature
 2006: Austrian State Prize for European Literature
 2008: Walter Hallstein Prize
 2009: Friedenspreis des Deutschen Buchhandels
 2009: Prix Européen de l'Essai Charles Veillon
 2009: Prix Jean Monnet European Literature
 2009: Vilenica Prize – Slovenian international literature prize for Central European authors
 2009: Knight of the Order of Arts and Letters of Spain
 2012: Austrian Decoration for Science and Art
 2012: Cross of the Order of Merit of the Federal Republic of Germany
 2014: FIL Literary Award in Romance Languages
 2015: Pour le Mérite
 2015: Knight Commander's Cross of the Order of Merit of the Federal Republic of Germany
 2016: Franz Kafka Prize
 2019: Thomas Mann Prize

Honorary doctorates
 1991: University of Strasbourg
 1993: University of Copenhagen
 1995: University of Klagenfurt
 1999: University of Szeged
 2011: Katholieke Universiteit Leuven (Belgium)
 2011: University of Barcelona
 2014: University of Murcia
 2014: West University of Timisoara
 2017: Free University of Berlin
 2018: University of Regensburg

Memberships
 2001: Academy of the Arts, Berlin, Section Literatur
 Deutsche Akademie für Sprache und Dichtung, Darmstadt
 Bayerische Akademie der Schönen Künste, Munich
 Akademie der Wissenschaften und der Literatur, Mainz
 Österreichische Akademie der Wissenschaften, Wien
 Accademia delle scienze di Turino
 Akademie der Wissenschaften, Göttingen

Works
Illazioni su una sciabola (1984; translated as Inferences from a Sabre),
Danubio (1986; translated as Danube: A Sentimental Journey from the Source to the Black Sea),
Stadelmann (1988),
Un altro mare (1991; translated as A Different Sea)
Microcosmi (1997; translated as Microcosms).
Alla cieca (2006; translated as Blindly).
Non luogo a procedere (2015; translated as Blameless).

References

Further reading
 Pireddu, Nicoletta. (2015) The Works of Claudio Magris: Temporary Homes, Mobile Identities, European Borders. London and New York: Palgrave Macmillan. 
 ---. (2012) "On the Threshold, Always Homeward Bound: Claudio Magris's European Journey." The Journal of European Studies 42 (4): 333–341.
 ---. (2022) Guest Editor, Claudio Magris and the Quest for Europe. Special Issue, The European Legacy 27 (7-8), 2022. 
 
 Wampole, Christy. (2014) "'Cyberia, Syberia...': Clones, Virtual Spaces, and Cyber-Selves in Claudio Magris' Alla cieca." MLN 129(1): 162–179.

External links

 Claudio Magris, écrivain de frontière contre l'indifférence (on Swans Commentary) 
 Nicoletta Pireddu, The Works of Claudio Magris. Temporary Homes, Mobile Identities, European Borders (Palgrave, 2015)

1939 births
Living people
Writers from Trieste
Italian essayists
Italian male writers
Italian columnists
Italian translators
Germanists
Strega Prize winners
Order of Arts and Letters of Spain recipients
Recipients of the Austrian Cross of Honour for Science and Art, 1st class
Knights Grand Cross of the Order of Merit of the Italian Republic
Members of the Academy of Arts, Berlin
Recipients of the Austrian State Prize
Recipients of the Austrian Decoration for Science and Art
Knights Commander of the Order of Merit of the Federal Republic of Germany
Recipients of the Pour le Mérite (civil class)
University of Turin alumni
Academic staff of the University of Trieste
Members of the Senate of the Republic (Italy)
Male essayists
German–Italian translators